Pushkino is a rural locality (a settlement) in Rubtsovsky Selsoviet, Rubtsovsky District, Altai Krai, Russia. The population was 343 as of 2013. There are 3 streets.

Geography 
Pushkino is located 10 km west of Rubtsovsk (the district's administrative centre) by road. Sad-gorod is the nearest rural locality.

References 

Rural localities in Rubtsovsky District